The lined flat-tail gecko (Uroplatus lineatus) is a gecko which is found in eastern Madagascar and on the island Nosy Bohara. These geckos live on trees in tropical rain forests and on bamboo plants. They reach a total length of 270 mm. Threats to this species are posed by deforestation and illegal pet trade.

Taxonomy and etymology
The generic name, Uroplatus, is a Latinization of two Greek words: "ourá" (οὐρά) meaning "tail" and "platys" (πλατύς) meaning "flat".  Its specific name, lineatus, is the Latin word for "lined" in reference to the longitudinal stripes on the lizard's body.

References

lineatus
Reptiles of Africa
Endemic fauna of Madagascar
Reptiles described in 1836
Taxa named by André Marie Constant Duméril
Taxa named by Gabriel Bibron